The following is a list of managers of Bulgarian side Botev Plovdiv.

Managerial history

Key
* Served as caretaker manager.

References

Lists of association football managers
Managers